Rhadinaea decorata is a species of snake in the family Colubridae. It is found in Central and South America.

References 

Reptiles described in 1858
Taxa named by Albert Günther
Colubrids
Snakes of South America